There have been three baronetcies created for persons with the surname Wilmot, one in the Baronetage of Ireland and two in the Baronetage of Great Britain. One creation (of Chaddesden) is extant as of 2008.

The Wilmot Baronetcy, of Witney in the County of Oxford, was created in the Baronetage of Ireland on 1 October 1621 for Arthur Wilmot. The title became extinct on his death in 1629.  He lived at Wield, Hampshire and was uncle of Charles, Viscount Wilmot to whom he left most of his estate, while also providing for Dorothy Waringe wife of Arnold Waringe, who was probably his natural daughter.

The Wilmot Baronetcy, of Chaddesden in the County of Derby, was created in the Baronetage of Great Britain on 15 February 1759 for Edward Wilmot, Physician to the Army and Physician-in-Ordinary to King George II and King George III. The third and fourth Baronets served as High Sheriff of Derbyshire in 1803 and 1852 respectively. The fifth Baronet represented Derbyshire in the House of Commons.

The Wilmot Baronetcy, of Osmaston in the County of Derby, was created in the Baronetage of Great Britain on 10 October 1772 for Robert Wilmot, Secretary to the Lord Lieutenant of Ireland. The second Baronet was High Sheriff of Derbyshire in 1796. The third Baronet, Sir Robert Wilmot-Horton, was a statesman who was Member of Parliament for Newcastle-under-Lyme and served as Governor of Ceylon. The fourth Baronet was high sheriff of Derbyshire in 1846. The title became extinct on the death of the sixth Baronet in 1931.

The Wilmot baronets of Chaddesden and Osmaston both share a common ancestry with the Eardley-Wilmot baronets of Berkswell Hall.

Wilmot baronets, of Witney (1621)
Sir Arthur Wilmot, 1st Baronet (died 1629)

Wilmot baronets, of Chaddesden (1759)

Sir Edward Wilmot, 1st Baronet (1693–1786)
Sir Robert Mead Wilmot, 2nd Baronet (1731–1793)
Sir Robert Wilmot, 3rd Baronet (1765–1842)
Sir Henry Sacheverell Wilmot, 4th Baronet (1801–1872)
Sir Henry Wilmot, 5th Baronet (1831–1901)
Sir Ralph Henry Sacheverell Wilmot, 6th Baronet (1875–1918)
Sir Arthur Ralph Wilmot, 7th Baronet (1909–1942)
Sir Robert Arthur Wilmot, 8th Baronet (1939–1974)
Sir Henry Robert Wilmot, 9th Baronet (born 1967)

Wilmot baronets, of Osmaston (1772)
Sir Robert Wilmot, 1st Baronet (c. 1708–1772)
Sir Robert Wilmot, 2nd Baronet (c. 1752–1834)
Sir Robert John Wilmot-Horton, 3rd Baronet (1784–1841)
Sir Robert Edward Wilmot, 4th Baronet (1808–1880)
Sir George Lewis Wilmot-Horton, 5th Baronet (1825–1887)
Sir Robert Rodney Wilmot, 6th Baronet (1853–1931)

See also
Eardley-Wilmot baronets

Notes

References
Kidd, Charles, Williamson, David (editors). Debrett's Peerage and Baronetage (1990 edition). New York: St Martin's Press, 1990, 

Baronetcies in the Baronetage of Great Britain
Extinct baronetcies in the Baronetage of Ireland
Extinct baronetcies in the Baronetage of Great Britain
Baronetcies created with special remainders
1621 establishments in Ireland
1759 establishments in Great Britain